The 2019 France Women's Sevens is the final tournament within the 2018–19 World Rugby Women's Sevens Series and the fourth edition of the France Women's Sevens. For the first time in the tournament's history, it is held over the weekend of 15–16 June 2019 at Parc des Sports Aguiléra in Biarritz. With New Zealand already qualified for the 2020 Summer Olympics, and the United States only needing to field a team to become eligible, the remaining two slots shall be determined over the weekend based upon overall series ranking.

Format
The teams are drawn into three pools of four teams each. Each team plays every other team in their pool once. The top two teams from each pool advance to the Cup brackets while the top 2 third place teams also compete in the Cup/Plate. The other teams from each group play-off for the Challenge Trophy.

Teams
Eleven core teams are participating in the tournament along with one invited team, Scotland:

Pool stage
All times in Central European Summer Time (UTC+02:00)

Pool A

Pool B

Pool C

Knockout stage

Challenge Trophy

5th place

Cup

Tournament placings

Source: World Rugby

Players

Scoring leaders

Source: World Rugby

See also
 2019 Paris Sevens (for men)
 World Rugby Women's Sevens Series
 2018–19 World Rugby Women's Sevens Series

References

External links
 World Rugby page

2019
2018–19 World Rugby Women's Sevens Series
2019 in French women's sport
June 2019 sports events in France
2019 in women's rugby union
2018–19 in French rugby union